Hayden James Turner born 16 February 1966 in Sydney, Australia, is an Australian zookeeper and wildlife television presenter.

Life

Hayden Turner is a wildlife television presenter known through his work for the National Geographic Channel and TV.  He works alongside experienced television crews, leading producers, and directors; and has co-produced several of his programs.

Over the past twelve years, the former zookeeper has traveled extensively throughout the African continent and to more than 35 other countries. He has worked with numerous species but specializes in the husbandry of African mammals.

When not adventuring in some remote corner of the Globe, Hayden runs programs and gives talks for zoos and schools.

Television
Hayden had resigned from his ten-year job as a senior keeper at Taronga Zoo, Sydney, to visit Africa and work on volunteer conservation projects. Before leaving,  he took a party of VIPs on a behind-the-scenes tour. One of the groups was Bryan Smith, general manager of National Geographic Channel in Australia. Impressed by the passion and depth of knowledge Hayden displayed and struck by his unique presentation skills, Bryan asked him if he'd be interested in taking a digital video camera to Africa to record his adventures.

Hayden appeared in a Play School episode in 1993 as a zookeeper when they visited the Taronga Zoo.

Career highlights

Former senior zoo keeper, Taronga Zoo Sydney 1990-1998.
Former reporter: Earth Pulse, Go Wild, Out There, National Geographic Channel.
Presenter:  Turner's Video Postcards National Geographic Channel.
Presenter:  Green Car, National Geographic Channel.
Presenter: Hayden Turner's Wildlife Challenge, National Geographic Channel.
Presenter: Beyond Tomorrow.
Presenter: WildEarth.tv.

External links
Hayden Turner
National Geographic Channel Presenters: Meet Hayden

References

Australian television presenters
Zookeepers
People from Sydney
1966 births
Living people